Brünn is a municipality in the district of Hildburghausen, in Thuringia, Germany.

References

External links

Hildburghausen (district)
Duchy of Saxe-Meiningen